Finchley tube station could refer to one of a number of London Underground stations serving the Finchley area of north London:

 East Finchley
 Finchley Central
 West Finchley

Finchley Road station is located in Swiss Cottage.

Disambig-Class London Transport articles